BBC Radio 5 was a national radio station that broadcast sports, children's and educational programmes. It ran from 1990 to 1994 and was transmitted via analogue radio on 693 and 909 kHz AM.

On 28 March 1994, three years and seven months after the station started, it was replaced by Radio 5 Live, following the success of rolling news coverage of the Gulf War on Radio 4 News FM.

History

Launch
A new fifth national radio station was first announced by the BBC on 9 October 1988. In line with the Conservative government's broadcasting policy at the time, the BBC ended its longstanding practice of simulcasting its services on both AM and FM, freeing the medium wave frequencies which Radio 2 had been using since 23 November 1978 for another use.

On 15 August 1990, Radio 2 began to draw to a close its medium wave transmissions by broadcasting a daytime information service providing advice about how to listen on FM as well as advertisements for the new station. This continued until 2.00pm on the day before Radio 5's launch, and Radio 2 ended its medium wave transmissions at midnight on Sunday 26 August. Nine hours later, at 9.00am on Monday 27 August, Radio 5 launched with five-year-old boy Andrew Kelly uttering the words:

Prior to this, the new station's frequencies broadcast a long sequence of programming trails linked by Jon Briggs (one of the station's launch presenting team) and pre-recorded sketches from comedians Trevor Neal and Simon Hickson (consisting of the two larking about in the studio amid the strains of "Sailing By", and Trevor suddenly being cut off while he was reading his so-called "Ode to Radio 5"). The official first programme was Take Five, a pre-recorded program by Bruno Brookes.

Structure
Many believed that BBC Radio 5 was a service the four other main BBC stations did not want, reflected in a speech by Jenny Abramsky, News International Visiting professor of Broadcast Media 2002 at Exeter College, Oxford University. Abramsky described the service,

In 1991, Operation Desert Storm was launched, as part of the multinational response to the Iraqi invasion of Kuwait. From 16 January, Radio 4's FM frequencies were used to provide an all-news network for the coverage of the war, dubbed 'Radio 4 News FM' (or more popularly in the media as Scud FM), but despite protests mainly received praise for the quality of this service and the speed with which it was established. Following the end of the conflict, Radio 4 resumed its normal schedule but the positive response to commencing review into the possibility of providing a full-time news station, leading to the broadcast of a similar service on longwave during the 1992 general election campaign. Due to the resistance to any use of Radio 4 FM (or LW) frequencies, it was decided that Radio 5, criticized by John Birt as "improvised and disjointed", would relaunch as a combined news and sports channel.

Demise
The "old" Radio 5 signed off at midnight on Sunday 27 March 1994 with a pre-recorded Nigel and Earl sketch at the end of one of the network's Irish music magazine program Across the Line. Ten minutes later, the frequencies closed down for the night following a generic BBC Radio News and Sport bulletin and the new Radio 5 Live began its 24-hour service at 5.00am on Monday 28 March.

Programming
The station was on air daily from 6.00 am until just after midnight although initially, apart from sports coverage, original programming was restricted to key times of the day – breakfast, mid-mornings and on weekdays drive and evening programmes for young people. The rest of the day was filled with simulcasts of other BBC stations and with programmes from the World Service which were broadcast for several hours each day. World Service programmes were aired at 6.00am, 11.00pm and for two hours on weekday afternoons, Radio 3 was broadcast on weekday lunchtimes, and Radio 4 on Saturday evenings, and on Sunday lunchtime and teatime. Radio 1 and Radio 2 were also simulcast on Sundays – Radio 2 in the afternoon when there was no sports coverage and Radio 1 during the early evening as a replacement for Open University programmes.

From spring 1991, the station started to expand its original programming and this replaced the rebroadcasting of programmes from other BBC networks. The first to be discontinued, at the end of March 1991, was the 11.00pm World Service block, followed in autumn by the simulcasts of other BBC stations, and May 1992 saw the removal of the weekday afternoon block of World Service programmes. This meant that the station was now producing its own programming every day from 6.30am until just after midnight. The 6.00am World Service news bulletin simulcast remained throughout the station's time on air.

The new network allowed the BBC to significantly enhance its sports coverage, especially in its later years. For example, during the 1992 Barcelona Olympics, the network devoted its entire output to the event and during the summer months, sports coverage was broadcast all afternoon every day of the week.

Weekdays
 Morning Edition – with Sarah Ward, Jon Briggs, Danny Baker and Michele Stephens
 This Family Business and The AM Alternative – with Johnnie Walker
 The Health Show – with Angela Rippon
 Sound Advice – with Guy Michelmore, Daire Brehan and Liz Barclay
 The Crunch – with Liz Kershaw
 BFBS Worldwide
 Sportsbeat – with Ross King and Tommy Boyd
 A Game of Two Halves – with John Inverdale, Frances Edmonds, Caron Keating and Mark Kermode
 Five Aside – with Sue McGarry and Julian Worricker
 John Inverdale's Drive-in

Weekends
 On Your Marks – with Mark Curry
 Get Set – with Steve Johnson
 Go! – with Ross King and Garth Crooks
 Sportscall – with Dominik Diamond
 Sunday Edition – with Barry Johnston
 Simon Fanshawe's Sunday Brunch

Evenings
 Fabulous – with Mark Lamarr/Johnny Vaughan
 Fantasy Football League – with Dominik Diamond
 Trevor Brooking's Football Night
 6-0-6 – with Danny Baker/David Mellor
 Formula Five
 Room 101 – a later transfer to television
 They Think It's All Over – with Des Lynam, another transfer to television
 Cult Radio – with Marc Riley
 Le Top – a translated version of the French chart show on Europe 1
 The Mix – with Mark Thomas
 Hit the North – with Mark Radcliffe and Marc Riley, who featured the first ever radio session from Oasis
 Earshot – with John Kavanagh
 Eastern Beat
 Rave – with Rob Brydon
 Across the Line 
 The Mark Steel Solution

Presenters

 Danny Baker
 Liz Barclay
 Tommy Boyd
 Daire Brehan
 Jon Briggs
 Bruno Brookes
 Trevor Brooking
 Rob Brydon
 Garth Crooks
 Mark Curry
 Dominik Diamond
 Frances Edmonds
 Simon Fanshawe
 Simon Hickson
 John Inverdale
 Steve Johnson
 Barry Johnston
 Caron Keating
 Mark Kermode
 Liz Kershaw
 Ross King (presenter)
 Mark Lamarr
 Des Lynam
 Sue McGarry
 David Mellor
 Guy Michelmore
 Trevor Neal
 Mark Radcliffe
 Miranda Rae
 Marc Riley
 Angela Rippon
 Mark Steel
 Michele Stephens
 Johnny Vaughan
 Johnnie Walker
 Sarah Ward
 Pete Wardman 
 Julian Worricker

References

BBC Radio 5 (former)
BBC Radio 5 Live
Defunct BBC national radio stations
Radio stations established in 1990
Radio stations disestablished in 1994
1990 establishments in the United Kingdom
1994 disestablishments in the United Kingdom
1990s in the United Kingdom
Sports radio stations in the United Kingdom
Educational broadcasting in the United Kingdom